The 2000 BC Lions finished in third place in the West Division with an 8–10 record. With the team sitting at 3–4, head coach Greg Mohns resigned allowing for receivers coach Steve Buratto to take over the team on an interim basis. The Lions won four of their last five regular season games and entered the post-season with heavy momentum.  As such, they became the first team in CFL history with a losing record to win the Grey Cup. Long-time Lion Lui Passaglia retired following the championship, after a CFL record 25 seasons in the league.

Offseason

CFL Draft

Preseason

Regular season

Season standings

Season schedule

Awards and records
 CFL's Most Outstanding Canadian Award – Sean Millington (RB)

2000 CFL All-Stars
 RB – Sean Millington, CFL All-Star
 OT – Chris Perez, CFL All-Star
 K – Lui Passaglia, CFL All-Star

Western Division All-Star Selections
 RB – Sean Millington, CFL Western All-Star
 SB – Alfred Jackson, CFL Western All-Star
 OT – Chris Perez, CFL Western All-Star
 K – Lui Passaglia, CFL Western All-Star
 DE – Herman Smith, CFL Western All-Star
 CB – Eric Carter, CFL Western All-Star

Playoffs

West Semi-Final

West Final

Grey Cup

References

BC Lions seasons
N. J. Taylor Trophy championship seasons
Grey Cup championship seasons
Bc Lions Season, 2000
2000 in British Columbia